Drenova is a village in the municipality of Čajetina, western Serbia. According to the 2011 census, the village had a population of 96 inhabitants.

References

Populated places in Zlatibor District